Myurellopsis is a genus of marine snails, gastropod mollusks in the family Terebridae, subfamily Terebrinae.

Species
Species within the genus Myurellopsis include:
 Myurellopsis alisi (Aubry, 1999)
 Myurellopsis columellaris (Hinds, 1844)
 Myurellopsis guphilae (Poppe, Tagaro & Terryn, 2009)
 Myurellopsis joserosadoi (Bozzetti, 2001)
 Myurellopsis kilburni (R. D. Burch, 1965)
 Myurellopsis monicae (Terryn, 2005)
 Myurellopsis nathaliae (Drivas & Jay, 1988)
 Myurellopsis parkinsoni (Bratcher & Cernohorsky, 1976)
 Myurellopsis paucistriata (E. A. Smith, 1873)
 Myurellopsis undulata (Gray, 1834)
 Myurellopsis vaubani (Aubry, 1999)

References

External links
 Fedosov, A. E.; Malcolm, G.; Terryn, Y.; Gorson, J.; Modica, M. V.; Holford, M.; Puillandre, N. (2020). Phylogenetic classification of the family Terebridae (Neogastropoda: Conoidea). Journal of Molluscan Studies

Terebridae